Douglas Malcolm Craig OBE is former chairman of York City Football Club. Craig is an engineer and a former local Conservative councillor.

York City

Early years
Craig took over the club in as chairman in 1990, taking over from Michael Sinclair, a former businessman who is now a local priest. He enjoyed success under the guidance of manager John Ward and, later, Alan Little, York enjoyed their best period in recent years. The club won promotion to what was then the English Second Division (now League One) in 1993 before making headlines with its giant-killing cup exploits, beating Manchester United over two legs in the League Cup. The cup glory continued the following year. Craig earned national notoriety in 1994 by becoming the only chairman to refuse to sign up to the "Let's Kick Racism Out of Football" campaign.

Latter years; sell off and results
The following years under Craig were bleak for York, with relegation to Division Three and managers coming and going.

In July 1999, Craig wrote to all York City's shareholders, asking them to approve a plan to transfer the club, and Bootham Crescent, to a new company, Bootham Crescent Holdings (BCH). Craig pointed out that he and his three fellow directors, John Quickfall, Colin Webb and the former playing hero Barry Swallow, owned 94 per cent of the shares and had already approved the plan. This sent York into serious financial turmoil, and the club went into administration shortly after Craig had sold it, minus all fixed assets, to John Batchelor for a fee rumoured to be £50.

York City was later rescued by a trust, which had been set up by the club's supporters. Craig sold the ground back to the Supporter's Trust, but for a figure that was many times larger than the reputed £50,000 that he reputedly paid for the club, many years earlier.

In 2002, Douglas Craig was on a 3 man FA panel that overruled The Football League’s decision that had prevented Wimbledon moving to Milton Keynes.  On appeal, The Football League allowed Wimbledon to relocate to Milton Keynes in 2003.

References

Living people
People from Broughty Ferry
Officers of the Order of the British Empire
Conservative Party (UK) politicians
English football chairmen and investors
York City F.C. directors and chairmen
Politicians from Dundee
Year of birth missing (living people)